Zavoj is a village in the municipality of Ohrid, North Macedonia. It used to be part of the former municipality of Kosel.

A small village, there are no shops or schools in Zavoj. There are about a hundred houses and it houses a church of Sv. Bogorodica (The Holy Mother of God) where thousands gather to the village to celebrate the Holy Day on 28 August every year.

Demographics
In the Ethnography of the Provinces of Adrianople, Monastir and Thessaloniki , published in Constantinople in 1878, Zavoj is listed as a village with 60 households and 170 Bulgarian inhabitants. According to the statistics of Bulgarian ethnographer Vasil Kanchov from 1900, 280 inhabitants lived in Zavoj, all Bulgarian Exarchists. 

According to the 2002 census, the village had a total of 12 inhabitants. Ethnic groups in the village include:
Macedonians 12

Tribes in Zavoj
Founders: Cvetanovci (9 houses), Krstanovci (8 houses) and Tasevci (6 houses), all three tribes come from Old Zavoj

References

Villages in Ohrid Municipality